Norwich by-election may refer to:

 1870 Norwich by-election
 1871 Norwich by-election
 1904 Norwich by-election
 1915 Norwich by-election
 1917 Norwich by-election
 2009 Norwich North by-election